Ricardo William Faty (born 4 August 1986) is a professional  footballer who plays as a midfielder. Born in France, he represents the Senegal national team.

Career
Faty was born in Villeneuve-Saint-Georges, France. His football career began with Strasbourg in the 2004–05 season of the Championnat de France Amateurs, in which he played 27 matches and scored one goal. The following year he earned fourteen more caps in the CFA, along with twelve matches for RC Strasbourg's professional squad, five being in cup competition. His Ligue 1 debut was on 29 October 2005.

During 2005–06 UEFA Cup, A.S. Roma faced Strasbourg in the group stage, and Luciano Spalletti noted the young Frenchman, so the following year, due to Strasbourg's relegation to Ligue 2 and Olivier Dacourt's departure from Roma to Inter Milan, Faty was signed to giallorossi for a fee of 350,000 Euros for a five-year contract.

He made his Champions League debut with Roma against Olympiacos at the Karaiskákis Stadium. He was given the job of man-marking the former Brazilian star Rivaldo. Roma eventually won the match 1–0. He employed this role so well and efficiently that Luciano Spalletti praised him and many tabloids and newspapers named him the "new" Patrick Vieira.

At the end of his first season in Serie A he said that, though he was satisfied of his experience at A.S. Roma, he would like to transfer on loan to have more chances to play and thus, on 6 July, he moved to German team Bayer Leverkusen for a two-year loan. In January 2008, he was loaned to FC Nantes, where he stayed until the end of the 2008–09 Ligue 1 season. On 31 July 2010, it was revealed that Faty would be joining English Premier League club Blackburn Rovers on trial for an undisclosed length of time. The trial came to nothing as Faty then signed for Greek club Aris Salonica.

In his first season in Thessaloniki (2010–2011), Faty played in about 35 matches and scored two goals (against Kerkyra and Rosenborg BK).

In 2012, he joined Ajaccio.

On 18 August 2014, Faty signed a four-year contract with Standard Liège.

In the summer 2018, Faty joined Turkish club MKE Ankaragücü. On 9 May 2019, he announced on Instagram, that he had terminated his contract with the club, according to him because he was left out of the squad and had not received his salary.

On 16 September 2020, Faty joined Reggina, signing a three-year contract. He missed most of the 2020–21 season with injuries and made no appearances in the 2021–22 season for the club. On 6 August 2022, his contract with Reggina was terminated by mutual consent.

Personal life
He is the younger brother of Jacques Faty, who is also a professional footballer. Though they were born in France, their father is Senegalese and their mother is from Cape Verde. His father is Muslim and his mother is Catholic, while Faty converted to Islam at age 20, while playing for Roma, and hopes to end his career in a Gulf country to increase his faith.

Honours
Strasbourg
 Coupe de la Ligue: 2004–05

Roma
 Coppa Italia: 2006–07; runner-up: 2009–10
 Supercoppa Italiana runner-up: 2006

Nantes
 Ligue 2: runner-up 2007–08

References

External links
 
 Ricardo Faty at racingstub.com 
 
 

1986 births
Living people
Sportspeople from Villeneuve-Saint-Georges
Association football midfielders
French footballers
France under-21 international footballers
Citizens of Senegal through descent
Senegalese footballers
Senegal international footballers
INF Clairefontaine players
RC Strasbourg Alsace players
A.S. Roma players
Bayer 04 Leverkusen players
FC Nantes players
Aris Thessaloniki F.C. players
AC Ajaccio players
Standard Liège players
Bursaspor footballers
MKE Ankaragücü footballers
Reggina 1914 players
Ligue 1 players
Serie A players
Serie B players
Bundesliga players
Ligue 2 players
Super League Greece players
Belgian Pro League players
Süper Lig players
Senegalese expatriate footballers
Expatriate footballers in Belgium
Expatriate footballers in Germany
Expatriate footballers in Greece
Expatriate footballers in Italy
Expatriate footballers in Turkey
French expatriate sportspeople in Belgium
French expatriate sportspeople in Germany
French expatriate sportspeople in Greece
French expatriate sportspeople in Italy
French expatriate sportspeople in Turkey
Senegalese expatriate sportspeople in Belgium
Senegalese expatriate sportspeople in Germany
Senegalese expatriate sportspeople in Greece
Senegalese expatriate sportspeople in Italy
Senegalese expatriate sportspeople in Turkey
French sportspeople of Cape Verdean descent
French sportspeople of Senegalese descent
Senegalese people of Cape Verdean descent
Sportspeople of Cape Verdean descent
Converts to Islam
French Muslims
Senegalese Muslims
Footballers from Val-de-Marne